The 29th International Film Festival of India was held from 10–20 January 1998 in New Delhi. The competitive edition was restricted to "Asian Directors.

Winners
Golden Peacock (Best Film): Golden Peacock Award: "The King of Masks" by "Wu Tianming" (Chinese film)
Silver Peacock (Best Film): Best Film: Silver Peacock Award: "Paper Airplanes" by "Farhad Mehhranfar" (Iranian film)
Silver Peacock Special Jury Award: "Adajya" by "Santwana Bardoloi" (Assamese film)

References

1998 film festivals
29th
1998 in Indian cinema